Children's Hospital Los Angeles (CHLA) is a nationally ranked, freestanding acute care children's hospital in the East Hollywood district of Los Angeles, on Sunset Boulevard at the corner of Vermont Avenue. The hospital has been academically affiliated with the Keck School of Medicine of the University of Southern California since 1932 and the hospital features 401 pediatric beds. The hospital provides comprehensive pediatric specialties and subspecialties to infants, children, teens, and young adults generally aged 0–21 throughout California and the west coast. The hospital also sometimes treats adults that require pediatric care. The hospital has a rooftop helipad and is an ACS verified level I pediatric trauma center, one of a few in the region. The hospital features a regional pediatric intensive-care unit and an American Academy of Pediatrics verified level IV neonatal intensive care unit.

U.S. News & World Report ranks CHLA as the fifth best children's hospital in the United States and the best in California.  It has also received Magnet Recognition from the American Nurses Credentialing Center.

About 
While most of the children admitted come from Los Angeles County, others come from the seven-county area near Los Angeles that includes Kern, Orange, Riverside, San Bernardino, San Luis Obispo, Santa Barbara and Ventura counties.  Additional referrals come from elsewhere around the world.

CHLA also has five outpatient specialty centers (located in Arcadia, Encino, Santa Monica, South Bay/Torrance, Glendale, and Valencia), as well as dozens of specialty physician offices across the Los Angeles Area.

The hospital does not turn away patients regardless of socioeconomic status or insurance coverage.

On the 2020-21 rankings the hospital was ranked as the #5 best children's hospital in the United States by U.S. News & World Report on the publications' honor roll list.

In November 2020, Dwayne "The Rock" Johnson collaborated with Microsoft and billionaire Bill Gates to donate Xbox Series X consoles to Children's Hospital Los Angeles along with 19 other children's hospitals throughout the country. In 2021, Koyamada International Foundation (KIF) has donated dozens of iPad Mini and a medical-grade video game kiosks to  the hospital during the pandemic.

Research and education 
Children's Hospital Los Angeles is home to The Saban Research Institute (TSRI), one of the largest and most productive pediatric research centers in the Western United States. The institution conducts laboratory, clinical, translational and community research designed to investigate the developmental origins of health and disease. More than 400 faculty collaborate to combat cancer, heart disease, brain disorders, autism, obesity and diabetes, among other devastating pediatric conditions. The hospital is the eighth most productive center in the nation, as measured by its funding levels from the National Institutes of Health—which provides highly competitive grants to researchers.

Training programs include 364 medical students, 277 student shadowers, 93 full-time residents, three chief residents and 127 fellows. For the past 19 years, 96 percent of those graduating from the CHLA Residency Program passed the American Board of Pediatrics exam on the first attempt, well above the national average of 75 to 80 percent.

In 2013, Stanley Black donated a $15 million to fund research and clinical care programs; CHLA's Gateway Building was renamed the Joyce and Stanley Black Family Building.

University affiliation 
The hospital has been academically affiliated with the Keck School of Medicine of the University of Southern California since 1932. Physician leaders all hold faculty appointments at USC.

Leadership 
The president and CEO is Paul S. Viviano who joined the institution in August 2015.

Sunset Bridge 
Children's Hospital Los Angeles has a bridge across Sunset Boulevard. The hospital's main bridge connects its north and south sides of its main campus with a bridge that crosses Sunset Boulevard, an iconic thoroughfare that traverses Hollywood and a major section of Los Angeles.

The 40-ton, 117-foot-long walkway bridge was bolted into place above Sunset Boulevard between Vermont Avenue and Rodney Drive in October 2012 and was dedicated in March 2013.

Construction of the Los Angeles city landmark was jointly supported by two of Los Angeles' most significant philanthropists, Cheryl Saban, PhD, and Marion Anderson, who, along with their spouses Haim Saban and the late John Edward Anderson, jointly funded the $10 million project.

Awards 
Children's Hospital Los Angeles is rated by U.S. News & World Report as a Best Children's Hospital and is ranked in all 10 specialties listed by the report.

Notable patients 

 Gabriel Fernandez (February 20, 2005 – May 24, 2013) — American boy who was abused and tortured by parents.
Genie (born 1957) — feral child who was abused, beaten, and neglected by parents.

Notable staff 

 Scott E. Fraser — professor
 Marion Jorgensen (March 18, 1912 – June 18, 2008) — honorary trustee who served on the board of colleagues

See also 

 UCLA Mattel Children’s Hospital
 List of children's hospitals in the United States
 Keck School of Medicine of USC

References

External links

This hospital in the CA Healthcare Atlas A project by OSHPD

Keck School of Medicine of USC
Teaching hospitals in California
Children's hospitals in the United States
Hospitals in Los Angeles
Healthcare in Los Angeles
Hospitals established in 1901
East Hollywood, Los Angeles
Pediatric trauma centers